Deraz Lat-e Bala (also Romanized as Derāz Lāt-e Bālā; also known as Derāz Lāt) is a village in Rahimabad Rural District, Rahimabad District, Rudsar County, Gilan Province, Iran. At the 2006 census, its population was 161, in 37 families.

References 

Populated places in Rudsar County